Andromeda Attumasen is a fictional character appearing in American comic books published by Marvel Comics. The character is an Atlantean of Marvel's shared universe, known as the Marvel Universe. She is the illegitimate daughter of Attuma.

Publication history 

Andromeda was introduced in The Defenders #143 (March 1985) and added to the titular supergroup's lineup a few issues later. Writer Peter B. Gillis later revealed, "My long-term plan was to populate The Defenders with my own crew of characters, characters who nonetheless had ties to interesting parts of the Marvel Universe. Andromeda, while not the Sub-Mariner, gave me a connection to Atlantis." However, Andromeda would be the last character Gillis added to the Defenders, since shortly after her debut he was told that the series was being cancelled.

Fictional character biography
A member of the Homo mermanus race, Andromeda is the illegitimate daughter of Attuma of Atlantis by a woman named Lady Gelva. He did not know of her existence until she confronted him and told him he was her father. Andromeda was raised in Atlantean society and trained in the arts of hunting and war and she exceeded any other male except for her father in these skills. Despite her skills, she was considered unworthy of promotion in the Atlantean military because she is a woman even though she was highly decorated.

Andromeda, inspired by Namor's tales, moved to the surface world, where she used a serum to give herself a human appearance and the ability to breathe out of water. She took the name Andrea McPhee and posed as a surface woman. When she was revealed as an Atlantean, she quickly abandoned her charade and became a member of the Defenders, joining them against a villain named Hotspur.

She was with the Defenders, christened the "New Defenders," for only a short time, revealing only portions of her background to them. With them, she traveled to outer space and battled the second Star-Thief. She fought Manslaughter as he menaced the team, and then aided the Defenders and the Interloper in battle against fellow Defender Moondragon, and the Dragon of the Moon who was possessing Moondragon. Andromeda sacrificed her life force, joining with Manslaughter, the Valkyrie, and the Interloper to drive the Dragon of the Moon from the Earth, and her body was turned to stone.

The Dragon would later return, this time without a body. To stop the Dragon of the Moon, Doctor Strange cast a spell which returned the souls of the Defenders fallen in the battle against the Dragon to the bodies of several recently deceased humans, changing them into duplicates of the Defenders. Andromeda's soul entered the body of Genevieve Cross and these Defenders now called themselves the Dragon Circle. Together the Dragon Circle banished the Dragon from Earth and Andromeda returned to the oceans.

Andromeda played an important part in the 1989 Atlantis Attacks crossover. Andromeda led a rebellion to stop her father Attuma from invading the surface world, but was bested by Attuma in personal combat. She was kidnapped unconscious by the Deviant priest Ghaur as one of his "Seven Brides of Set." Under Ghaur's domination, she accompanied She-Hulk to acquire a piece of Set's life force. In the end the Brides of Set gained their freedom thanks to the Fantastic Four and Avengers.

Andromeda joined her forces with those of Namor. She was part of the short-lived Deep Six, a group of underwater heroes. During this time, her mind and that of Genevieve Cross would repeatedly exchange control and even turn her body into a copy of Genevieve's. Andromeda sacrificed her own mind to save Namor's soul, leaving Genevieve in control of Andromeda's body. Months later, either Genevieve in Andromeda's body or a restored Andromeda herself assisted Namor and the Defenders against Attuma's own Deep Six. Andromeda was last seen as an ally of Namor, living in Atlantis.

Andromeda later appears as a member of Namor's Defenders of the Deep, Namor's own super-team assembled to impose his will on the surface world's presence in the oceans.

Powers and abilities
As a member of the race of Homo Mermanus, Andromeda can breathe underwater, and has more durable skin which allows her to survive in great depths. She is also able to move freely underwater. However, without special aid she will die in the open air. To counteract this, Andromeda uses a serum that allows her people to survive up to 12 hours out of the water, and in addition, provides her with the skin color of a surface-dweller. Without her serum, Andromeda loses her vitality the longer she spends out of the water, and would eventually die if she was out of water for long enough. Andromeda is proficient in many weapons but prefers the Atlantean trident. She is also skilled in hand-to-hand combat, and as a military leader. She is superhumanly strong and can lift around 4 tons in the air, and at least 14 tons underwater.

Notes
 Genevieve Cross is called Genevieve Cass in the Dragon Circle entry in the Handbook of the Marvel Universe '89 edition.

References

External links
 
 

Comics characters introduced in 1985
Fictional characters with superhuman durability or invulnerability
Marvel Comics Atlanteans (Homo mermanus)
Marvel Comics characters who can move at superhuman speeds
Marvel Comics characters with superhuman strength
Marvel Comics female superheroes